"Not a Moment Too Soon" is a song written by Wayne Perry and Joe Barnhill and recorded by American country music artist Tim McGraw. It was released in October 1994 as the fourth single and title track from McGraw's 1994 album Not a Moment Too Soon.  The song reached number one on the US Billboard Hot Country Singles & Tracks (now Hot Country Songs) charts.  Despite reaching that position, the song did not appear on Tim's Greatest Hits album.  It did, however, later appear on his second Greatest Hits package, Reflected: Greatest Hits Vol. 2.

Music video
The music video was directed by Sherman Halsey, who directed the majority of McGraw's videos, and features McGraw singing at Battery Point Lighthouse in Crescent City, California.

Chart performance
"Not a Moment Too Soon" debuted at number 61 on the U.S. Billboard Hot Country Singles & Tracks for the week of October 29, 1994.

Year-end charts

References

1994 singles
Tim McGraw songs
Song recordings produced by Byron Gallimore
Song recordings produced by James Stroud
Music videos directed by Sherman Halsey
Curb Records singles
Songs written by Wayne Perry (country music)
1994 songs